Turkey–Morocco relations are the foreign relations between Morocco and Turkey, and spanned a period of several centuries, from the early 16th century when the Ottoman Empire neighbored Morocco to until modern times.

The history between the Ottoman Empire and Morocco constitutes a strong basis for the current bilateral relations without any historical prejudices.

Diplomatic relations between Turkey and Morocco were established on 17 April 1956 by a joint declaration of the Governments of two countries; following the proclamation of independence of the Kingdom of Morocco.

History of Ottoman-Morocco relations

Notable Battles
 Campaign of Tlemcen (1551)
 Battle of Taza (1553)
 Capture of Fez (1554)
 Battle of Tadla (1554)
 Campaign of Tlemcen (1557)
 Battle of Wadi al-Laban (1558)
 Expedition to Mostaganem (1558)
 Capture of Fez (1576)
 Battle of Moulouya (1691)
 Battle of Chelif (1701)

Ottoman occupation of Tlemcen (Algeria) (1517)
The brothers Hayreddin and Oruç Barbaroussa became very powerful with the Fall of Tlemcen (1517) and the Capture of Algiers (1516) and again the definitive Capture of Algiers (1529) with the help of the Ottoman Sultan after they joined the empire, they progressively ended the influence of Spain and the Zayyanid with whom they had signed a peace treaties during the rise of the Ottoman influence in the west Mediterranean. After the 1517 fall of Tlemcen, the Zayyanid Sultan of Tlemcen had already fled to Fez in Morocco to find refuge.

At the time the Saadian dynasty was emerging in southern Morocco, which had been successful in repelling the Portuguese from southern Morocco, particularly from Agadir in 1541. The Saadians challenged the rule of the Moroccan dynasty of the Wattasids in northern Morocco, and tried to unify Morocco under their rule.

Ottoman occupation of Tlemcen (1545)
The Moroccans and Ottomans started to interact closely from around 1545. In June 1545, Hasan Pasha, son of Hayreddin Barbarossa and ruler of the Regency of Algiers, occupied the city of Tlemcen, where he set a Turkish garrison, and put pro-Ottoman Sultan Muhammad on the throne. Hassan Pasha hoped to establish an alliance with the Wattasids against the Spanish. The Wattasids in turn hoped to obtain Ottoman military support against their enemies.

The Saadians were the enemies of the Wattasids, but also considered the Ottomans with disdain: religiously, the Saadians were considered descendants of the Prophet, being Sherifians, whereas the Ottomans were only recent converts in comparison.

Wattasid alliance with the Ottomans

In the first half of the 16th century Morocco was unstable as a result of conflicts between local rulers and the fact that it was not united under one dynasty.

Things came to a head in 1545, when the Wattasid ruler of northern Morocco Sultan Ahmad was taken prisoner by his southern rivals the sharifian Sadiyans. After this had occurred his successor Ali Abu Hassun, who was now the Wattasid ruler in northern Morocco, with the hopes of gaining military help in order to remain in power, formally recognised the authority of the Ottomans and declared himself as their vassal. At the same time, the Ottomans started to exert direct influence in Tlemcen from 1545, where they ousted Mansur bin Ghani, the chief of the Banu Rashid, and placed Sultan Muhammad on the Tlemcen throne instead.

Mansur bin Ghani went to Spain with Count Alcaudete, the Governor of Oran, to obtain military support for a campaign against the Ottomans. In 1547, Spain mounted an expedition against Ottoman Mostaganem, and failed, but in the meantime Mansur captured Tlemcen from the Ottomans and put his brother Ahmad in place as ruler. Following the Spanish defeat, the Ottomans reconquered the area, and again put Sultan Mohammad on the throne of Tlemcen.

The Ottomans were unable to intervene when the Saadians conquered Fez in 1549 and ousted pro-Ottoman regent Ali Abu Hassun. Ali Abu Hassun was nevertheless offered asylum in Algiers.

1551 Moroccan offensive

As the Ottomans were set to put Ali Abu Hassun back on the throne, the Saadians set up an offensive on the Regency of Algiers in 1551.

The Saadian ruler Mohammed ash-Sheikh sent an army of 30,000 men, led by his son Muhammad al-Harran, to invade Tlemcen in 1551. They took the city easily, from which the Ottoman garrison had been removed in 1547. The Saadian army continued to the Ottoman stronghold of Mostaganem, but failed to capture the city. On this occasion, the Emir of the Banu, which had been an enemy of the Ottomans for 30 years, actually sided with the Ottomans against the Saadians, and provided troops. The Moroccan Saadian army was repulsed by the combinaison of tribal troops and Ottoman Janissaries led by Hasan Qusru. Al-Harran died of illness in Tlemcen. The last Zayyanid ruler of Tlemcen, Hasan, fled to Spain, and died there a few years later.

Hasan Qusru managed to conquer Tlemcen from the Moroccans, and put an Ottoman governor and garrison in place, establishing direct Ottoman rule, and putting an end to the Zayyanid dynasty that had ruled the city.

Ottoman capture of Fez (1554)

In 1552 Suleiman the Magnificent attempted a diplomatic rapprochement with the Saadians, putting the blame on Hasan Pasha for the conflict, and removing him from his rule in Algiers. He was replaced by Salah Rais, who nevertheless marched on Fez and captured the city at the beginning of the year in 1554, when the Moroccan ruler Mohammed ash-Sheikh rejected cooperation with the Ottomans. He put Ali Abu-Hassun in place as Sultan of Fez and vassal of the Ottomans, supported by Janissaries. In September 1554 however, Mohammed ash-Sheikh managed to recapture Fez, and started negotiations with Spain to oust the Ottomans.

Hasan Pasha was again named beylerbey of Algiers in June 1557, in order to continue the fight against the Moroccan ruler, who had formed an alliance with the Spanish against the Ottomans. He had Mohammed ash-Sheikh assassinated in October 1557, it is said that the assassin, Sahil, sneaked into the command tent and decapitated ash-Sheikh after drawing an axe.

Ottoman invasion of Morocco (1558)

Hasan Pasha invaded Morocco in early 1558, but he was stopped by the Moroccans north of Fez at the Battle of Wadi al-Laban, and had to retreat upon hearing of Spanish preparations for an offensive from Oran. He reembarked from the port of Khassasa in northern Morocco, and from there returned to Algiers to prepare a defense against the Spaniards.

Mostaganem expedition (1558)

The Spanish attacked the Ottomans with Saadian support in the Expedition to Mostaganem (1558), but failed . The failure of the expedition of Mostaganem ended attempts at a grand alliance between Spain and Morocco against the common Ottoman enemy.

Saadian dynastic feuds and Ottoman influence

After the murder of Mohammed ash-Sheikh by the Ottomans in 1557 and the following struggle for power, the three younger sons of Mohammed ash-Sheikh had to flee their elder brother Abdallah al-Ghalib (1557–1574), leave Morocco and stay abroad until 1576. The three exiled brothers, Abdelmoumen, Abd al-Malik and Ahmad, the latter both future Sultans of Morocco, spent 17 years in exile Istanbul, where they received Ottoman training. In January 1574, while in Istanbul, Abd al-Malik was saved from an epidemic by French physician Guillaume Bérard. They later became friends due to this event. When Abd al-Malik became Sultan, he asked Henry III of France that Guillaume Bérard be appointed Consul of France in Morocco.

Abd al-Malik took service with the Ottomans. In 1574, Abd al-Malik participated in the Conquest of Tunis (1574) on the side of the Ottomans. Murad III organised an expedition after Abd al-Malik had made a deal with him to make Morocco an Ottoman vassal in exchange for support in gaining the Saadi throne. Ramazan Pasha and Abd al-Malik left from Algiers in order for Abd al-Malik to be placed on the Saadi throne as an Ottoman vassal. Ramazan Pasha arrived in Fez with Abd al-Malik and the Ottoman army and conquered Fez, this caused the Saadi Sultan to flee to Marrakesh which was also conquered.   Abd al-Malik then assumed rule over Morocco as an Ottoman vassal recognising Ottoman suzerainty. He sent the Ottoman troops back to Algiers in exchange for gold while suggesting a looser concept of vassalage than the Ottoman sultan may have supposed.  Abd al-Malik recognised himself as a vassal of the Sublime Porte.

In the following period he tried to revive trade with Europe and especially England, starting an Anglo-Moroccan alliance with Elizabeth I. According to Richard Hakluyt, quoting Edmund Hogan, ruler "Abdelmelech" bears "a greater affection to our Nation than to others because of our religion, which forbids the worship of Idols".

Battle of Ksar El Kebir (1578)

The Battle of Ksar El Kebir, also known as Battle of Three Kings, or "Battle of Oued El Makhazeen" in Morocco, and Battle of Alcácer Quibir in Portugal (variant spellings are legion: Alcácer-Quivir, Alcazarquivir, Alcassar, meaning grand castle in Arabic), was fought in northern Morocco, near the town of Ksar-el-Kebir and Larache, on 4 August 1578. The combatants were the army of the deposed Moroccan Sultan Abu Abdallah Mohammed II, with his ally, the King of Portugal Sebastian I, and a large Moroccan army nominally under the new Sultan of Morocco (and uncle of Abu Abdallah Mohammed II) Abd Al-Malik I.

The Christian king, Sebastian I, had planned a crusade after Abu Abdallah asked him to help recover his throne.[5] Abu Abdallah's uncle, Abd Al-Malik, had taken it from him with Ottoman support. The defeat of Portugal and attendant death of the childless Sebastian led to the end of the Aviz dynasty, and the integration of the country in the Iberian Union for 60 years under the Philippine Dynasty in a dynastic union with Spain.

Summary of Ottoman Presence in Morocco
In 1554 an Ottoman army managed to conquer Fez and install Abu Hassun on the throne as an Ottoman vassal, which lasted around 9 months, the Wattasids had previously declared themselves as vassals of the Ottomans by formally recognising the authority of the Ottoman sultan in 1545, however they were defeated and lost Fez to the Saadians in 1549.  In 1576 an Ottoman army of no more than 10,000 men commanded by Abd al-Malik and Ramazan Pasha, defeated a Saadi force of 30,000 men, conquered Fez, took Marrakech and installed Abd al-Malik on the throne of Morocco as an Ottoman vassal. From 1792–1795 the Ottomans of Algiers had possession of the Moroccan Rif and Oujda, which they abandoned after 3 years in 1795 and then was recaptured by the Moroccans. In eastern Morocco, specifically in Oujda, the Regency of Algiers reigned there longer than 100 years.

Modern relations

Free trade agreement
The Turkish-Moroccan Free Trade Agreement (FTA) entered into force on 1 January 2006. The foreign trade balance between the two countries is in favor of Turkey. This agreement was later revised for more equitable terms for Morocco in 2013 by Moulay Hafid Elalamy, the former Moroccan Minister of Industry. Except the decline in 2009 as a result of the global economic crisis, the volume of annual bilateral trade is over US$1 billion. In 2010, the trade volume increased by 22% and reached US$1.02 billion of which US$624 million is the export volume of Turkey. Turkey is the 12th export and 10th import partner of Morocco.

European Union
In 1987, both Morocco and Turkey applied for membership of the European Coal and Steel Community, a predecessor of the European Union. Morocco's application was turned down as it was not considered European, but Turkey's application was considered eligible on the basis of the 1963 Ankara Association Agreement, but the opinion of the Commission on the possible candidate status had become negative. Turkey did not receive European Union candidate status until 1999 and began official membership negotiations in 2004. Currently, 11 of the 35 chapters have been opened with Turkey, with 1 already closed.

Morocco has in recent years changed its geopolitical order line and developed a partnership within Africa. As of 2017, it is a full member of the African Union.

See also
 Conflit maroco-ottoman: an article on the Ottoman-Moroccan Conflict, on French Wikipedia

Notes

 
Political history of Morocco
Bilateral relations of the Ottoman Empire
Bilateral relations of Turkey
Turkey